Shahraban Abdullah is an Emirati pediatric cardiologist.

She was the first doctor from the United Arab Emirates to specialize in cardiology for pediatrics. She is the head of the children's section in Al Wasl hospital (now Latifa Hospital), and chairperson of the Pediatrics Society in UAE. She is also the chairperson of the Dubai Health Authority's Standing Child Protection Committee.

References

Year of birth missing (living people)
Living people
Emirati cardiologists
Emirati pediatricians
People from Dubai